A Beautiful Life may refer to:

 A Beautiful Life (2008 film), an American drama by Alejandro Chomski
 A Beautiful Life (2011 film), a Hong Kong romance by Andrew Lau

See also
 Beautiful Life (disambiguation)
 Life Is Beautiful (disambiguation)
 Bella Vita (disambiguation), "Beautiful Life" in Italian
 Belle vie (disambiguation), "Beautiful Life" in French